Digernessundet is a strait in the municipality of Stord in Vestland county, Norway. The Stord Bridge crosses the Digernessundet.

References

Landforms of Vestland
Straits of Norway
Stord